Pyper is a surname and a given name. Notable people so named include:

 Andrew Pyper, Canadian writer of fiction
 Gavin Pyper (born 1979), British motor racing driver
 George D. Pyper (1860–1943), the fifth general superintendent of the Sunday School of The LDS Church)
 Jenny Pyper, Northern Ireland civil servant
 Laura Pyper, Northern Irish actress
 Pyper America (born 1997), American fashion model and musician

See also
 Piper (given name)
 Piper (surname)
 John Pyper-Ferguson (born 1964), Australian-born actor